The men's shot put was a track and field athletics event held as part of the Athletics at the 1904 Summer Olympics programme. It was the third time the event was held. The competition was held on August 31, 1904. 8 athletes from 2 nations competed. The event was won by Ralph Rose of the United States, the nation's third consecutive victory in the men's shot put. Americans won silver (Wesley Coe) and bronze (Lawrence Feuerbach) as well, completing the second consecutive podium sweep in the event.

Background

This was the third appearance of the event, which is one of 12 athletics events to have been held at every Summer Olympics. None of the throwers from 1900 returned. Ralph Rose of the United States had broken the world record earlier in 1904 but had not won any major competitions. His countryman, Wesley Coe, had won the AAA championship multiple times. The two were the favorites, with an edge to Rose. As in 1896 and 1900, Irishman Denis Horgan would have been a significant contender but did not attend.

No nations made their debut in the men's shot put this year. Both nations that competed in 1904 were making their third appearance, having also competed in 1896 and 1900 as well.

Competition format

The format of the competition is unclear; it appears that each there was a single round of throwing with each thrower receiving six attempts. The throwing stage was a 2.13 metre circle, the first time the modern circle was used in the Games rather than a square.

Records

These were the standing world and Olympic records (in metres) prior to the 1904 Summer Olympics.

* unofficial

Ralph Rose set a new Olympic record in his first try with 14.35 metres only to be bettered by Wesley Coe in his first try when he threw 14.40 metres. Finally Ralph Rose set a new Olympic record and repeated his own unofficial world record with 14.81 metres in his fifth throw.

Schedule

Results

Georgantas, the only non-American entrant, withdrew in disgust after officials called his first two attempts fouls for throwing (rather than putting) the shot. 

Limited throwing sequences and results are known.

References

Sources
 

Athletics at the 1904 Summer Olympics
Shot put at the Olympics